The Alupa dynasty (ಅಳುಪೆರ್, ಆಳ್ವೆರ್) (circa 2nd  century C.E to 15th century C.E) was an ancient ruling dynasty of India. The kingdom they ruled was known as Alvakheda Arusasira and its territory spanned the coastal districts of the modern Indian state known as Karnataka. The Alupas in their prime were an independent dynasty, centuries after reigning due to the dominance of Kadambas from Banavasi, they became feudatory to them. Later they became the vassals of the Chalukyas, Rashtrakutas,  Hoysalas with the change in political scenario of Southern India. Their influence over coastal Karnataka lasted for about 1200 years. There is evidence that the Alupas followed the law of matrilineal inheritance (Appekatt/Aliyasantana) since the Alupa king Soyideva was succeeded by his nephew Kulasekhara Bankideva (son of Alupa princess Krishnayitayi and Hoysala Veera Ballala III). The legendary king who is credited with introducing matrilineality in  Alva Kheda|Tulu Vishaya Kheda is named Bhuta Alupa Pandya The descendants of this dynasty still survive to this date and have spread in the karavali region and they are widely called as Bunt The Buntfollows Matrilineality, unlike any other warrior community, they can be identified with their surnames such as Shetty, Rai, Hegde, Alva, Chowta etc., even though most Bunt are hindus  by faith now, The sizeable section of the community still follows Jainism and they are called Jain Bunt The last Alupa king to have ruled is Kulasekharadeva Alupendradeva whose inscription dated 1444 CE have been found in Mudabidri Jain Basadi.

Etymology and origin

The name of the dynasty is variously recorded in inscriptions as Alupa, Aluva, Alva, Aluka and Alapa The origin of Alupas prior to the Kadambas is unclear as there are no epigraphical evidences. Ptolemy, the 2nd century geographer identifies the Alvakheda as Olokhoira which is widely believed to be a corruption of the term Alva Kheda, 'the land of the Alvas'.

In the Tulu language,  (Alup) means 'to rule',  (Alupunu) means 'ruling',  /  /  (Alupe) means 'ruler' (one who rules). According to B. A. Saletore, the name Alupa may be derived from its variant Aluka which is an epithet of the divine serpent Shesha of Hindu epics.
Fleet has suggested that the name Aluka may possibly denote the Nāgas, who in early times were included in Chalukya dominions. Saletore further adds that the Naga origin of the Alupas is proved by two facts. The figure of a hooded serpent which is found in an effaced Alupa stone inscription in the Gollara Ganapati temple in Mangalore and their ultra Saivite tendencies. Saletore dismisses the idea regarding the Dravidian origin of the name from the Kannada word Alu meaning 'to rule' or 'govern'.

Historian P. Gururaja Bhat states that the Alupa royal family were possibly of local origin who were followers of "Shaivism" and later 10th century they accepted Jainism,  Bunt-Nadava caste. Whereas, B. A. Saletore mentions that the title Alupa (Alva) survives till this day in the Bunt community .

The rule over Uttara Kannada region, with Banavasi as its capital was by Chutu clan followed by the Shatavahana branch which governed for Siri, Siva, Pulumavi and Yajna Satakarnis, prior to the Kadambas. With the Kadambas rule from Banavasi, Karnataka saw developments in the field of art and culture. Land of Karnataka saw more and more epigraphs that recorded the activities of the past, mostly erected in the temple premises. The first clear mention of Alupas comes from the Halmidi inscription of 450 CE where their possible early ruler Pashupathi of Alapa (Alupa) gana is mentioned. Pashupathi was the contemporary of the Kadambas. Hence for historical record, we can safely assume that the dynastic formation of Alupas took place around 5th century CE. Their royal emblem was the double fish and they claimed to belong to the Pandyavamsha and Soma Kula (lunar dynasty). Their coins carried the dynastic title "Sri Pandya Dhananjaya" which means "Arjuna among the Pandyas". The Alupas now remain as Bunts of Costal Karnataka

Land
Although Alupas controlled part of Uttara Kannada and Shimoga of Karnataka and northern part of Kerala during the zenith, the core region consisted of the Old Dakshina Kannada district which comprises Modern Dakshina Kannada district and Udupi district. In the ancient times, the region was referred as Alvakheda and during the later part of the reign, the region between swarna and chandragiri river was referred as Tulunadu. The term Tulunadu is still practised today while referring to the region.

1. Alvakheda

The term Alvakheda could be seen in several of ancient inscriptions of the Alupas. The region of Alvakheda encompassed the modern Tulunadu, northern and central part of Udupi district and part of Uttara Kannada up to Ankola on the coastal north and Banavasi on the interior west of Uttara Kannada District. Also, the region of Humcha in the Shimoga district, and the land of Kasaragod in Kerala up to the Payasvini river was the boundary in the south. The term Alvakheda is not seen in the inscriptions during the Vijayanagara period, when the region of Barakuru and Mangalore were two separate provinces under the administration of Governors who started controlling the territory without interfering in the autonomy of the Alupas.

2. Tulunadu
The region stretches from Mangalore in the south all the way to swarna river in the north. On the west is the Arabian sea and on the east is the Western Ghats that fences the land like a fort that formed a heaven for the ruler. More than it, number of rivers that crisscrossed near Mangalore, Udyavara  made this land fertile. The western ghats, the thick forests and the towns along the shoreline of Arabian sea established several sea ports for trade with the Romans and Arabs.  Trade routes from with the Romans were well established as early as the 2nd century CE and with the Arabs around 7th century CE. The Netravati in Mangalore and Seethanadi in Barkur are the main rivers that run in the capital cities of Alupas.  Other rivers such as Suvarnanadi, Shambhavi in Karkala and Mulki, Gurupura river, Pavanje, Nandini and numerous streams all running from east to west.  The region of Puttur, Sullia, Belthangady and Puttur, Karkala are the Malnad region and supported as an agricultural backbone of the kingdom and the region of Mangalore, Udupi and Kundapur are the coastal regions that supported more of marine activities though agriculture is the other occupation.

An Old Malayalam inscription (Ramanthali inscriptions), dated to 1075 CE, mentioning king Kunda Alupa, can be found at Ezhimala (the former headquarters of Mushika dynasty) near Cannanore, Kerala.

Political history
The history of clan emerges from obscurity during the rise of Badami Chalukya in the Aihole and Mahakuta inscriptions which claims the Alupas had accepted Chalukya overlordship and become their feudatory. They ruled initially from Mangalore and other times from Udyavara in Udupi and later Barkur. Their first regular full-length inscription is the Vaddarase inscription in Kannada is dated to early 7th century. They maintained marital relations with their overlords over the centuries.

Alupas rule confined to the modern districts of Udupi, Mangalore and parts of Shimoga and Uttara Kannada districts in the state of Karanataka and part of northern Kerala (Kasaragod district) up to Payashvini river. In the history of India, no other single dynasty has ever ruled for over thousands years. The record that breaks this exception goes to the Alupas who ruled their territory for nearly thousand years.  Alupas though originated as a ruler to the coastal region of Karnataka around the beginning of the Christian era, it is only around the 5th century they made their debut as a dynasty as witnessed in the epigraph of Halmidi. The last ruler's name that we see in the epigraph of Venupura (Moodubidre), belong to the 14th century CE. There are over two hundred stone epigraphs left behind this dynasty and only about one hundred and twenty epigraphs have been read and deciphered so far. The finest record of the early Kannada script is seen in the 7th century CE copper plate of Belmannu.  There is yet another set of five copper plates that surfaced in the beginning of 2007, but no information is known about the ruler, provenance within the district of Udupi or its content.

Alupas put coins into circulation in 8th century CE and continued the tradition till 14th century CE. Their coins carried the dynastic emblem of "Two fishes over a spread Lotus flower, below a royal umbrella". Nearly 180 unique coins have been known so far, of which around 175 coins are published in the book written by Prabhu and Pai. The detailed history, with proper reference pointers is also seen in the same book.

Epigraphs

The earliest known copper plate inscription in Kannada language is attributed to Aluvarasa II, called the Belamannu plates and is dated the early 8th century, according to Dr. Gururaj Bhat. This full-length Kannada copper plates in Old Kannada or Halegannada (Kannada: ಹಳೆಗನ್ನಡ) script (early 8th century CE) belongs to the Alupa King Aluvarasa II from Belmannu, Karkala Taluk, Udupi District, and displays the double crested fish, the royal emblem of Alupa kings. The records also refers to the king with the title Alupendra.

The first known epigraph that talks about the possession of Banavasi Mandala (Banavasi kingdom of Uttara Kannada District) by the Alupas, belongs to the reign of Western Chalukya king Vinayaditya. Te epigraph comes from Jambani of Sagar Taluk, discovered by Dr Gururaj Bhat, mentions about Chitravahana Alupendra in possession of Kadamba mandala. This is, in fact, the first stone epigraph that points the ruler as a subordinate to Western Chalukya King (8th century CE). An Old Malayalam inscription (Ramanthali inscriptions), dated to 1075 CE, mentioning king Kunda Alupa, the ruler of Alupa dynasty of Mangalore, can be found at Ezhimala (the former headquarters of Mushika dynasty) near Cannanore, in the North Malabar region of Kerala. It is one of the oldest inscriptions available about Alupa dynasty.

Chronology

Art and architecture
The Alupas built some fine temples in their area of rule. The Panchalingeshwara temple at Barkur, Brahmalingeshwara temple at Brahamavar, Koteshwara temple at Kotinatha and the Sadashiva temple at Suratkal are attributed to them. They used sculptural styles from their various overlords over the centuries.

1. Sri Rajarajeshwari Temple, Polali

In modern Mangalore District, Polali Rajarajeshwari Temple is one of the oldest temple that has the earliest inscription of the Alupa dynasty, written in 8th century Kannada. The temple is dedicated to Sri Rajarashewari, and Alupa kings enriched this temple during throughout their rule.

2. Sri Manjunatheshwara Temple, Kadri

In modern Mangalore district, Kadri has the other important and old temple that belonged to the era of Alupas. The temple has several finest bronze statues installed by the King Kundavarma, which bears inscriptions of him dated 968 CE. In the inscription of Lokeshwara statue, king Kundavarma is compared to Arjuna in bravery.

3. Sri Mahishamardini Temple, Neelavara
In times, Alupas changed their capital from Mangalore to Udyavara, Udyavara to Mangalore and then again to Barkur depending on the political situation and demand. To be in centre to their ruling place, they even shifted their capital to Barakur from where they could look after the vast territory which spread up to Ankola in the North Kanara (Uttara Kannada District).  During this period, they patronised several temples in the surrounding areas of Barakuru (which was their capital). Neelavara Kshetra is one such a holy place where Mahishasuramardini temple has several Alupa inscriptions of later period.

4. Sri Panchalingeshwara Temple, Vittla
This temple is one of the oldest temple of Alupa territory, built during 7th century CE. The architecture of the temple is in line with that of Sri Ananteshwara temple which is the oldest temple built by the Alupas. The architecture is unique and is an innovation of 7th century. The Havyaka Brahmins of Uttara Kannada were attracted during 7th century CE by the Alupas and were given Agraharas for imparting Vedic knowledge to the people of Alvakheda.  The Alupas built many temples and allowed these Brahmins to take care of it. The legend says that there were hundreds of temples that every day there is a festival in one or other temple of the region.  The temple of Vittla Panchalingeshwara is one of the oldest structure which was renovated by the later local dynasties such as Heggades.

5. Sri Anantheshwara Temple, Udupi
Diagonally opposite to the main entrance of the Sri Krishna Mutt, and adjacent to the Chandramouleeshwara Temple, stands one of the oldest Alupa temple namely Sri Anantheswara Temple.  An old belief is that lighting a lamp at the ancient Anantheshwara Temple takes away evil and sins. It is one of the biggest temple in Udupi. The main idol is Linga, whose adornment makes it to look like a Face of Lord Siva. From a small window on the left, the site where Madhvacharya disappeared is seen.

Both Sri Vittla Panchalingeshwara and Sri Udupi Anantheshwara Temple have Elephant-back type curvilinear structure. Another temple of similar architecture is also seen in Aihole Durga temple, appears to be a structure of 7th century CE. So, tagging it to any architectural style is ruled out unless more detailed study or research is done on this topic. The unique noteworthy feature of the architecture of South Canara temples is their roof.  Being in a landscape of high rainfall, the temple roofs evolved from grass, clay tiles and eventually with the copper-plates.

Coinage
The Alupas as a feudatory of the Western Chalukyas in coastal Karnataka issued coins with Kannada and Nagari inscriptions on them. Coins with Kannada legends seem to have minted in Mangalore and those with Nagari legend at the Udupi mint. Kannada was their language of administration. The Pagodas and Fanams were the common coinage of all the Alupa kings.  The obverse of the coins carried the royal emblem "Two Fishes" and the reverse had the legend "Sri Pandya Dhanamjaya"  either in Nagari or old (Hale) Kannada.

This paragraph is about the inscription found at Neelavara temple of Udupi district. This is all about the grant in "Gadyana" denomination. The Alupas while ruling from Barakuru showed great interest in the development of temple. This record is of the Alupa ruler Veerapandyadeva, dated 1258 CE mentions about his instruction to "neeruvara munnuru" i.e. Neeruvara-300, the modern Neelavara village Assembly. It states that after paying 100 gadyanas (coins) to the palace and 30 gadyanas to Adhikari, remaining 30 gadyanas, should be used by the village assembly for its expense. Yet another inscription of Veerapandyadeva's queen Ballamahadevi, the next ruler is also seen here. The record mentions that when Ballamahadevi was ruling her kingdom with the help of samastapradanas, Deshi purushas, Bahattara niyogis and Rishi Purohita, she gave a grant to Niruvara Bhagavati, out of 100 honnus that is paid to the palace. This inscription was written by Keshava Senabhova as mentioned in the epigraph.

The Alupas were one of the three dynasties that issued gold coins as early as 8th century CE. The gold that used to mint coins came from trade with the Romans, Arabs and from the adjacent kingdom of Gangas. No other ancient dynasties of the south have issued that many varieties of gold coins as Alupas and Gangas did.  The coins of both Gangas and Alupas have inscriptions that helps in dating the period of issue. Unfortunately these coins have not drawn much attention compared to that of Chalukyas or Hoysalas. But for sure, they have inspired later dynasties as a prototype or basis to issue coins.  Shown below is the hand-drawing of some of the Pandya Gadyanas (Alupa coins) obverse image.

Notes

References
 Dr. Suryanath U. Kamath, A Concise history of Karnataka from pre-historic times to the present, Jupiter books, 2001, MCC, Bangalore (Reprinted 2002)
 Govindraya Prabhu S, Nithyananda Pai M, "The Alupas, Coinage and history", 2006,  (Paperback),  (Hardbound), Manipal Printers, Published by SG Prabhu, Sanoor, 2006, 500 copies.
 Thulunaadina Shaasnagalu ... By K T Shaila Verma.
 Tjhulunaadina Jaina Arasu Manethanagalu published by Hampi University... under Edition  Of Chinnaswamy Sosale.

History of Karnataka
Dynasties of India
Medieval Kerala
Bunt (community)